Slobodan   "Bobo"   Živojinović (born 23 July 1963) is a Serbian former professional tennis player who competed for SFR Yugoslavia.

Together with Nenad Zimonjić, he is the only tennis player from Serbia to be the world No. 1 in doubles. As a singles player, he reached the semifinals of the 1985 Australian Open and the 1986 Wimbledon Championships, achieving a career-high ranking of world No. 19 in October 1987.

Tennis career
Živojinović represented SFR Yugoslavia as the number 15 seed at the 1988 Summer Olympics in Seoul, where he was defeated in the second round by France's Guy Forget.

The right-hander won two career singles titles (Houston, 1986 and Sydney, 1988), as well as eight doubles titles. He reached his highest singles ATP ranking on October 26, 1987, when he became world No. 19. Živojinović was known for his tall, wiry frame that made him the original big-boom server before Goran Ivanisevic. He built his game on his big serve, enhanced greatly by his height and his muscular thighs. He was an exciting player to watch and a very troubling one to play against. His ace total in a match often became difficult to overcome, with the result that no one looked forward to playing the big Serb.

Živojinović's most notable Grand Slam results were two semifinals. As an unseeded player at the 1985 Australian Open, he memorably beat John McEnroe in a five-set quarterfinal to reach the semifinals (where he lost in straight sets to Mats Wilander). The next year, at the 1986 Wimbledon semifinal, again as an unseeded player, he lost to Ivan Lendl in a five-set match.

Over the course of his career, Živojinović amassed an overall singles record of 150 wins and 138 defeats. He was much more successful in doubles competition, winning the US Open in 1986 with Andrés Gómez. The same year, he won three more tournaments. He was ranked as the world No. 1 doubles player on September 8, 1986.

Career finals

Singles (2–2)

Doubles (8–6)

Team competitions (1)

Grand Slam singles performance timeline

Personal life

Živojinović was engaged to Zorica Desnica with whom he has a son Filip. The couple broke up before getting married. Desnica later married basketball player Ivo Nakić whom she has a son Mario and daughter Iva with—their son Mario also went on to become a professional basketball player.

In 1991, Živojinović married Yugoslav folk singer Fahreta Jahić known as Lepa Brena.

Živojinović's media prominence, especially in the years since his retirement, owes much to his marriage to Lepa Brena, Yugoslavia's biggest commercial folk singing star. Their wedding on December 7, 1991 was a media event throughout the Socialist Federal Republic of Yugoslavia. The lavish ceremony took place at Belgrade's InterContinental Hotel with Ion Țiriac as the groom's best man. The level of interest in the event was such that Brena's manager Raka Đokić released a VHS tape of the wedding for commercial exploitation. Their very public relationship has been providing steady fodder for various yellow media publications ever since.

The couple have two sons — Stefan (born in New York City in May 1992) and Viktor. In the afternoon hours of Thursday, November 23, 2000, 8-year-old Stefan was kidnapped by members of Zemun mafia clan and returned on Tuesday five days later on the side of Belgrade–Niš highway for the ransom sum reported to be more than DM 2 million.

References

External links
 
 

|-

1963 births
Hopman Cup competitors
Living people
Olympic tennis players of Yugoslavia
Serbian male tennis players
Tennis players from Belgrade
Tennis players at the 1988 Summer Olympics
US Open (tennis) champions
Yugoslav male tennis players
Grand Slam (tennis) champions in men's doubles
ATP number 1 ranked doubles tennis players
Presidents of the Tennis Federation of Serbia